Horace David King (10 February 1915 – 7 March 1974) was an English first-class cricketer active 1934–46 who played for Middlesex. He was born in Brentford; died in Worthing.

References

1915 births
1974 deaths
English cricketers
Middlesex cricketers
Europeans cricketers